Horizon High School may refer to:

Horizon High School (Thornton, Colorado)
Horizon High School (Scottsdale, Arizona)
Horizon High School (Texas), Horizon City, Texas
Horizon High School (Pleasanton, California)
Horizon High School (Florida)
Horizon Junior/Senior High School, Evanston, Wyoming
Horizon High School in Shawnee Mission School District, Kansas
Keith Lutz Horizon High School, Omaha, Nebraska
Ormiston Horizon Academy in Chell, Stoke-on-Trent, Staffordshire

See also 
 Horizon (disambiguation)